David Valle (born October 30, 1960) is an American former professional baseball player. He attended Holy Cross High School in Flushing, New York. In 1995, Valle founded Esperanza International, a microfinance organization that serves families in poverty in the Dominican Republic. He's been an on air analyst for MLB Network since 2009, including appearing on MLB Now and MLB Tonight.

Career
At age seventeen, Valle was selected by the Seattle Mariners in the second round of the 1978 MLB draft. He played in the minor leagues for seven seasons before making his MLB debut at age 23 with the Mariners in 1984 on September 7. For the next two seasons, he split his playing time with the Mariners and the Calgary Cannons of the Pacific Coast League, producing a .312 batting average with 21 home runs and 71 runs batted in with Calgary during the  season.

He had his best offensive season in 1993, hitting for a .258 batting average with thirteen home runs and 63 runs batted in. He also led American League catchers in 1993 with 881 putouts, 57 baserunners caught stealing, a 7.05 range factor, finished second to Mike Stanley with a .995 fielding percentage, and finished third in assists behind Pat Borders and Iván Rodríguez. Early in the season on April 22, Valle caught Chris Bosio's 97-pitch no-hitter.

Valle became a free agent after the  season, and signed a one-year contract in late December with the Boston Red Sox, who traded him in June  to the Milwaukee Brewers for outfielder Tom Brunansky. He signed a two-year contract in December with the Texas Rangers, serving as a reserve catcher for the next two seasons to hall of famer Iván Rodríguez. The Rangers won the AL West in 1996. Rangers broadcaster Eric Nadel has credited Valle for calling a players only meeting during that season that helped turn around their season when they were struggling. That season would be the only one in Valle's career in which his club qualified for the playoffs. However, he did not appear in the ALDS that the Rangers lost to the New York Yankees. Valle retired in  while with the Atlanta Braves organization.

Career statistics
In a 13-year career, Valle played in 970 games, accumulating 658 hits in 2,775 at bats for a .237 career batting average along with 77 home runs and 350 runs batted in.  A solid defensive catcher, he ended his career with a .992 fielding percentage.

Broadcasting career
Valle was a color analyst for Seattle Mariners television and radio broadcasts from 1997 through 2013. Beginning in 2007, he co-hosted the post-game show on the Mariners' radio network. In 2009, he became one of the analysts on the MLB Network's MLB Tonight show. In 2011, he began co-hosting the Mariner pre-game and post-game shows on Root Sports. After a one-year hiatus to manage in the minors, he returned to the M's post-game show in 2015. Valle joined the Texas Rangers' announcing crew as an analyst for select Bally Sports Southwest telecasts in 2022.

Managerial career
Valle interviewed for the vacant Mariners managerial opening in November 2013, ultimately filled by Lloyd McClendon.

For the 2014 season, Valle was the manager of the Class A Everett AquaSox, the Mariners' nearby affiliate in the short-season Northwest League.

Esperanza
Esperanza International is a charitable organization founded in 1995 by Valle and his wife Victoria. It is a Christian development organization focused on serving the most impoverished families in the Dominican Republic and Haiti through microfinance initiatives, healthcare, education, and water.  As of 2015, Esperanza has served over 200,000 people on the island of Hispaniola.

References

External links

Baseball Gauge
Retrosheet
Venezuelan Professional Baseball League

1960 births
Living people
Alexandria Mariners players
American expatriate baseball players in Canada
American expatriate baseball players in Venezuela
Bellingham Mariners players
Boston Red Sox players
Calgary Cannons players
Chattanooga Lookouts players
Leones del Caracas players
Lynn Sailors players
Major League Baseball broadcasters
Major League Baseball catchers
Milwaukee Brewers players
Minor league baseball managers
MLB Network personalities
People from Bayside, Queens
Richmond Braves players
Salt Lake City Gulls players
San Jose Missions players
Seattle Mariners announcers
Seattle Mariners players
Sportspeople from Queens, New York
Baseball players from New York City
Texas Rangers (baseball) announcers
Texas Rangers players
Holy Cross High School (Flushing) alumni